Amye Everard Ball was the first woman in England to be granted a patent. Her patent for tincture of saffron was registered in 1637, merely 76 years after Elizabeth I had awarded the first patent. The original patent registration is held at the British Library.

References

History of patent law
17th-century English people
Patent holders
English inventors